The Church of St Augustine  is an Anglican parish church in Clutton Somerset, England. It was originally built around 1290, but much of it has been rebuilt since, and has been designated as a Grade II* listed building. The church is dedicated to St Augustine of Hippo.

The tower is made of red sandstone with diagonal buttresses ending in pinnacles and probably dates from 1726. The tower contains two bells dating from 1734, made by Thomas Bilbie of the Bilbie family.

Two railed tomb enclosures within the Broadribb family plot are also listed as Grade II,  as are a group of three Broadribb and Purnell monuments.

In 1780 John Wesley came to the church but was denied use of the pulpit, so he had to preach from a stone in the churchyard.

The parish is part of the benefice of Clutton with Cameley, Bishop Sutton and Stowey within the archdeaconry of Bath.

See also
 List of ecclesiastical parishes in the Diocese of Bath and Wells

References

Churches completed in 1290
13th-century church buildings in England
Church of England church buildings in Bath and North East Somerset
Grade II* listed churches in Somerset
Grade II* listed buildings in Bath and North East Somerset